The 1982 Wisconsin gubernatorial election was held on November 2, 1982. Democrat Anthony Earl won the election with 57% of the vote, winning his first term as Governor of Wisconsin and defeating Republican Terry Kohler. 

As of 2022, this is the most recent Wisconsin gubernatorial election where the Democratic candidate won by a double-digit margin. Martin J. Schreiber unsuccessfully sought the Democratic nomination and this marks the last occasion that the following counties have voted Democratic in a gubernatorial election: Jefferson and Fond Du Lac.

Results

References

1982 Wisconsin elections
1982
Wisconsin